USS Lillian II (SP-38) was an armed motorboat that served in the United States Navy as a patrol vessel in 1917.

Lillian II was built in 1909 by Willard Downes at Bayshore, New York, as a private motorboat of the same name. The U.S. Navy acquired Lillian II from her owner, S. F. Rothschild of Bayshore, under a bare-boat charter on 6 June 1917 for World War I service. She was enrolled in the Coast Defense Reserve on 8 June 1917, delivered to the Navy on 16 June 1917, and commissioned as USS Lillian II (SP-38) on 20 July 1917.

Assigned to the 3rd Naval District at New York City, Lillian II operated as a shore patrol boat in Great South Bay on the southern coast of Long Island, New York.

The Navy decommissioned Lillian II on 19 December 1917 and returned her to her owner on 20 December 1917.

References

NavSource Online: Section Patrol Craft Photo Archive Lillian II (SP 38)

Patrol vessels of the United States Navy
World War I patrol vessels of the United States
Ships built in New York (state)
1909 ships